Idan Zareski is a French-Israeli sculptor born in Haifa, Israel.
The artist has lived in multiple countries, in which he experienced different cultures and lifestyles. Now settled in Calmont, France, he expresses through his art and technique the impressions that these experiences have left upon him.

A self-taught sculptor 
By combining his ideas with materials such as Resin or Bronze, Idan creates bodies in movement balanced or frozen in space: sculpture projects that will be finalized in his workshops  in either France, Portugal, or Florida. The artist never took any art or anatomy course, he instead follows his instinct and emotions rather than any drawings or sketches: ninety percent of his creations are shaped in less than one hour. The memories of his childhood, mostly spent in Africa, represent his main source of inspiration: the artist recreates that to which he has been a witness while leaving space for improvisation to bring us the Bigfoot Family Project.

A peaceful call for hope 

A Bigfoot Family is born: Babyfoot, Bigfoot, Ladyfoot, Grandpafoot, Grandmafoot, Longfoot, Coolfoot, Le Siffleur, Le Rebel and La Nena are among the team members. Each one possesses his own characteristic while still keeping a common familiar symbolism: these big feet, which represent our roots, and our attachment to the same planet, the Earth. According to the artist, “no matter what our race or color is, where we live or who we are, we are all enslaved to our paradisiac planet, our home”.

This idea of unity among the human race is something Idan Zareski wants to express through his work. The artist diverts and transforms the human anatomy in his sculptures: amplification of body parts, relaxing attitude, dramatization, pop and generous colours varying from metallic purple to bright green. These elements contribute to surprising the audience, while portraying a tranquil, peaceful message. A more detailed observation of the sculptures reveals a reflection and critique of our own humanity: these family members all carry an awareness message about cultural differences and origins.

A globetrotter family 

The Bigfoot family members are present in various places around the world (Latin America, North America, Europe and Asia). Idan Zareski finds his artistic expression just as much in monumental sculptures as in little ones and his art work can now be found in various museums, galleries, shows, luxury hotels, and parks... Miami (USA), New York City (USA), Monaco, Panama City, Paris, Cartagena or San Jose (Costa-Rica) are among the various cities where the BigFoot Family has taken root. These sculptures often generate smiles and draw attention from the public: people of all age and ethnicity seem to want a part of them, to hug them and to take pictures with them.

Galleries and exhibitions

Galleries 
 Markowicz Fine Art in Miami, Florida and Dallas, Texas
 Bel air Fine Art – France
 Klaus Steinmetz Contemporary – San Jose, Costa Rica
 LGM Galeria – Colombia
 PrestaArt Gallery – France
ZK Gallery - San Francisco, USA, and Israel
Tilsitt Gallery - Porto, Portugal.

Exhibitions 
 Art Basel Miami – December 2022
 Art Up Lilles – France – June 2022
 Royal Monceau – Paris – Fébruary 2021 – December 2022
 Summer Sculpture Exhibition - Porto Montenegro – Montenegro – June – September 2021
 Art Up ! Lilles – France - June 2021
 CRS Taiwan – China – April 2021 – April 2022
 Le Village Royal - Paris – Décembre 2020
 International Art Show - Marina de Cascais - Nov-Dec 2020
 Monumental Sculpture Exhibit at Knokke with Bel-Air - Jun-Sep 2020
Miami Art Week 2019 Context-Art Miami
Giardini della Marinaressa, Biennale di Venezia, Italy - May-Novembre 2019
 Bel-Air Fine Art Crans-Montana, Switzerland - March 2019
Art Up! - Lille, France - March 2019
Bel-Air Fine Art Geneva Solo Show, Switzerland - January 2019
St. Tropez - France - July 2018
Le Touquet Paris Plage - France Summer 2018
 Art Miami 2017 - Miami, Florida - December 2017
BARCU 2017 (Bogotá Arte y Cultura) - Bogota, Colombia - October 2017
 Art Baku - Bogota, Colombia - October 2017
 Antwerp Art Fair - August 2017
 FAM – Marché Bonsecours – Montreal, Canada – June 2017
 art3f – Toulouse, France – February 2017
 art3f – Paris, France – January 2017
 LuxExpo – Luxembourg – December 2016
 art3f – Nice, France – October 2016
 Art Tentation – Monaco, France – September 2016
 Art Tentation – Isle sur la Sorgue, France – August 2016
 Solo Show Panama, Steinmetz Contemporary – October 2015
 Best of France – New York, USA – September 2015
 Mouche Gallery – Beverly Hills, USA – April 2015
 Valoarte – San Jose, Costa Rica – September 2014
 Village de marques – Nailloux, France – June 2014
 Miami Design District "Art Garden" – Miami, USA – January 2014
 Art Southampton – New York, USA – July 2014
 Escazu – San Jose, Costa Rica – February 2013
Context Art Miami – Miami, USA  – December 2013
 NAO Cartagena – Cartagena, Colombia – October 2013
 Stade Pierre Mauroy – Lille, France – May 2013
 Cologny, Switzerland – January 2013
 Botanical Garden – Miami Beach, USA – March 2012
 Context Art Miami – Miami, USA – December 2012
 Carla-Bayle, France – August 2012
 Puccini Festival – Torre del Lago, Italy – August 2012
 Scope Basel – Basel, Switzerland – June 2012
 Top Marques Monaco – Monaco – May 2012
 Art Monaco – Monaco – April 2012
 Scope Miami – Miami, USA – December 2011
 ARTBO – Bogota, Colombia – October 2011
 Jacob Karpio Who Galeria  – Costa Rica – October 2011
 Valoarte – San Jose, Costa Rica – September 2011
 Metalogik – Hotel Villa Caletas/Zephyr Palace, Costa Rica – July 2011 Curated and presented by Jacob Karpio
 Via Lindora – Santa Ana, Costa Rica – March 2011
 Mazeres, France – September 2008

References

Israeli sculptors
Living people
Year of birth missing (living people)